Diphasium scariosum, synonym Lycopodium scariosum, commonly known as spreading clubmoss or creeping club moss, is a species in the club moss family Lycopodiaceae. The genus Diphasium is accepted in the Pteridophyte Phylogeny Group classification of 2016 (PPG I), but not in other classifications which submerge the genus in Lycopodium. D. scariosum is native to Australia, New Zealand, and Borneo.

Diphasium scariosum has stems that lie on the ground, are multi branched and can grow to 2 m long. The leaves are flat and can be up to 4 mm long.

References

External links
 

Lycopodiaceae
Flora of New Zealand
Flora of Australia
Flora of Sabah
Plants described in 1786